Oliver Harry Sleightholme (born 13 April 2000 in Northampton, England) is an English professional rugby union footballer. He plays as a winger for Northampton Saints. His father, Jon Sleightholme, was an England international.

Youth career

Sleightholme spent all his youth career at Northampton Old Scouts, where he played alongside future Saints teammate Connor Tupai. He was a pupil at Northampton School for Boys, and played in the school's team that made it to the semi-final of the 2018 NatWest Schools Cup, in which he scored a try in a 19–12 defeat by Queen Elizabeth Grammar School, Wakefield. He played for the England rugby sevens team at the 2017 Commonwealth Youth Games in the Bahamas, and he scored a try in his team's loss to Samoa in the final. He scored a try on his debut for England under-18s in a 42–14 win against Wales under-18s on 25 March 2018.

Northampton Saints
Sleightholme signed a senior academy contract with Northampton Saints before the 2018–19 season. He made his debut for Northampton in a Premiership Rugby Cup match against Bristol Bears on 27 October 2018. And he made his Premiership debut three weeks later, scoring his first Northampton try 14 seconds after coming on as a second-half replacement against Wasps. In only his second European Rugby Challenge Cup game, he scored four tries against Timișoara Saracens on 18 January 2019.

England under-20s
Sleightholme was named in the England squad for the 2019 Six Nations Under 20s Championship, and he made his debut in the opening game against Ireland. He scored tries against both France and Italy to help England finish third in the competition.

Sleightholme also played at the 2019 World Rugby Under 20 Championship, and he scored two tries as England lost to Ireland in the opening game. He subsequently scored a try in England's final pool game against Australia, with England eventually finishing the tournament in fifth place.

Alan Dickens named Sleightholme in his 32-man England squad for the 2020 Six Nations Under 20s Championship.

England senior
He was called up to the senior England squad in September 2021 for a training camp.

References

External links
Premiership Rugby Profile
European Professional Club Rugby Profile
Northampton Saints Profile

2000 births
Living people
English rugby union players
Northampton Saints players
People educated at Northampton School for Boys
Rugby union players from Northampton
Rugby union wings